Flint Children's Museum in Flint, Michigan was inspired by a visit to a Washington D.C. children's museum in 1979. Local educator Mary Newman began Flint Children's Museum.

Located on the campus of Kettering University at 1602 University Ave. (Formerly Third Ave.) in Flint.

Background 

In 1980, a hands-on antiques and crafts exhibit for children was installed at Flint's Sloan Museum.  By 1986, the exhibit had grown so significantly that, with community support and additional grants, the Flint Children's Museum's first permanent location was established at NorthBank Center in downtown Flint, operating there for 7 years.

An anonymous gift in 1990 created the Mary Newman Endowment Fund at the Community Foundation of Greater Flint.  That fund, named for the museum's founder and first Executive Director, has since grown to over 1 million dollars, and the proceeds from that fund continue to provide support for the museum.

The current facility was donated by an anonymous donor, designated to house the Children's Museum through a long-term lease.  The Museum has been operating at this location since 1993.

Exhibits & Programs

Educational hands-on exhibits for children: 

 Mr. Bones - showing how our skeletons work
 The Discovery Zone - a rotating exhibit space where there is always something new
 Our Town - where they can shop for groceries or visit Frac-tions Pizza Parlor
 Recycled Rhythms - where they can develop their musical skills on a variety of unconventional instruments
 Center Stage - where young performers can act out anything they imagine
 The Tot Spot - a safe space with activities for our visitors ages 0–3
 Sproutside - a natural, outdoor learning area

Monthly Themed Activities

References

External links
 Flint Children's Museum webpage

Buildings and structures in Flint, Michigan
Children's museums in Michigan
Museums established in 1980
Kettering University
Museums in Genesee County, Michigan
Tourist attractions in Flint, Michigan